Vice-Admiral Sir William Charles Fahie KCB (1763 – 11 January 1833) was a prominent British Royal Navy officer during the American War of Independence, French Revolutionary War and the Napoleonic Wars. Unusually, Fahie's service was almost entirely spent in the West Indies, where he had been born and where he lived during the time he was in reserve and in his retirement. After extensive service in the Caribbean during the American War of Independence, during which Fahie impressed with his local knowledge, Fahie was in reserve between 1783 and 1793, returning to service to participate in Sir John Jervis' campaign against the French West Indian islands in 1794.

In 1810 he participated in the invasion of Guadeloupe and transferred to European waters for the first time since 1780. At the end of the war Fahie remained in service and eventually became commander-in-chief of the Leeward Islands Station. He retired in 1824 and was subsequently knighted, settling in Bermuda with his second wife.

Life
Fahie was born in Saint Kitts, one of the Leeward Islands, the son of a judge and part of a prominent family of Irish settlers. In 1777, aged 14, he was sent to serve in the Royal Navy during the American Revolutionary War, joining  under Captain John Colpoys. On Sandwich he was engaged in the Battle of Cape St Vincent off Southern Spain in 1780. Due to his knowledge of the island, Fahie was selected to take messages to the besieged garrison on Saint Kitts but was briefly captured in the attempt, before being released. He later served at the Battle of the Saintes.

At the end of the war, Fahie remained in service but in reserve, remaining on Saint Kitts with his family. In 1793, at the outbreak of the French Revolutionary Wars, Fahie was given command of the sloop , in which he participated in an attack on Fort-de-France, for which he was highly commended. In 1796 he became captain of HMS Perdrix. In her he engaged in one major action when on 12 December 1798 she took L'Armee d' Italie, a privateer of 18 guns. After a chase of 16 hours and an action of 42 minutes, the privateer was an unmanageable wreck. Of her crew of 117 men she had lost six dead and five wounded; Perdrix had only one man wounded, and some damage to her sails and rigging.

Fahie then served in European waters for some time, his first service out of the West Indies since 1780. In 1799 his ship was paid off, and Fahie remained in reserve until 1804, following the outbreak of the Napoleonic Wars.

For this service he was promoted into the ship of the line  and was prominently involved in the invasion of Martinique in January 1809. Pompee was subsequently heavily engaged at the action of 14–17 April 1809 with the French ship D'Hautpoul. Fahie successfully captured his opponent, but was badly wounded in the battle. By January 1810 he had sufficiently recovered to participate in the invasion of Guadeloupe in the captured D'Haupoult, renamed HMS Abercrombie.

In June 1810, Abercrombie escorted a convoy to Europe and was subsequently refitted in Britain, before join the squadron under Sir George Berkeley off Lisbon. For the next three years he operated in the Bay of Biscay and the English Channel in Abercrombie. For his services in that role he was made a Commander of the Order of St Ferdinand and Merit by the King of the Two Sicilies. In 1815 he was also made a Companion of the Order of the Bath. Returning to the West Indies in reserve, Fahie was subsequently promoted to rear-admiral in April 1819 and made commander of the Leeward Islands Station the following year. In 1821 he moved to Halifax, Nova Scotia as Commander-in-Chief, North America  Station. When he left this command in 1824, he retired from the Navy completely, settling in Bermuda with his second wife. During his retirement he continued to advance in rank, become a Knight Commander of the Order of the Bath in October 1824 and a vice-admiral in 1830. He died on Bermuda in January 1833, having lived almost his entire life in the Caribbean.

Notes

References
Fahie, Sir William Charles, Oxford Dictionary of National Biography, J. K. Laughton, (subscription required), Retrieved 26 February 2009

|-

1763 births
1833 deaths
Royal Navy vice admirals
Knights Commander of the Order of the Bath
Royal Navy personnel of the French Revolutionary Wars
Royal Navy personnel of the Napoleonic Wars
Royal Navy personnel of the American Revolutionary War
People from Saint Kitts